Robert "Bob" Hall (October 16, 1944) is an American comics artist and writer as well as a playwright and theatre director. He is the co-creator of the West Coast Avengers for Marvel Comics and has worked on such series as Armed and Dangerous and Shadowman, which he both drew and wrote for Valiant Comics.

Biography

Education 
Hall studied theater at the University of Nebraska–Lincoln and earned a bachelor's and master's degree there. Moving to New York in the early 1970s, he took courses at John Buscema's school of comic art and The New School.

Comics 
Hall began working in the comics industry in 1974 and drew horror stories for Charlton Comics. He soon moved to Marvel Comics and drew The Champions and Super-Villain Team-Up. Hall and writer Chris Claremont collaborated on Marvel Team-Up #74 (October 1978) which featured Spider-Man meeting the cast of NBC's Saturday Night Live Hall briefly worked as an editor for Marvel from 1978 to 1979 under Jim Shooter. Hall later joined Shooter as a writer and penciler at Valiant Comics.

Theatre 
Hall was co-founder of the New Rude Mechanicals, a New York City-based off-off-Broadway theatre company.

In the late 1970s, he co-wrote the script and co-created the set designs for the stage play The Passion of Dracula, which ran for two years off-Broadway in New York City, as well as in London. The Passion of Dracula also screened on Showtime.

Hall is the artistic director of the Flatwater Shakespeare Company of Lincoln, Nebraska, an organization he founded. Previously, he was artistic director of the Nebraska Repertory Theatre for six years, and in 2008 was artistic director of Lincoln's Haymarket Theatre.

Personal life 
Hall resides in Lincoln, Nebraska. He has previously lived in England and Ireland.

Bibliography

DC Comics
Batman #559 (1998)
Batman: DOA #1 (1999)
Batman: I, Joker #1 (1998)
Batman: Joker Time #1–3 (2000)
Chase #5 (1998)
House of Mystery #296 (1981)
Weird War Tales #100, 103, 108–109 (1981–1982)

Marvel Comics
 
The Amazing Spider-Man #222, 237, 286 (1981–1987)
The Avengers #213–214, 217, 219–221, 251–254, 280, 301, Annual #16 (1981–1989)
Avengers Spotlight #37 (1990)
Bizarre Adventures #33 (1982)
Captain America: The Movie Special #1 (1992)
Champions #8–10, 16 (1976–1977)
Daredevil #154 (1978)
Darkman #1 (1990)
Defenders #62, 64–66 (1978)
Fantastic Four Annual #12 (1977)
Human Fly #13–15 (1978)
Ka-Zar #23–24 (1983)
 Marvel Graphic Novel #27: "Emperor Doom" (1987)
Marvel Team-Up #74, 126 (1978–1983)
Marvel Two-in-One #44, 99 (1978–1983)
New Mutants #92 (1990)
Official Handbook of the Marvel Universe Deluxe Edition #3, 5, 13, 18–20 (1986–1988)
Power Man and Iron Fist #53–54 (1978)
The Spectacular Spider-Man #21–25, 74, 124–125 (1978–1987)
Psi-Force #7, 9, 11–12, 14 (1987)
Squadron Supreme #1–5, 8 (1985–1986)
Super-Villain Team-Up #10–12, 14 (1977)
Thor #330–331, 394, Annual #10–11 (1982–1988)
West Coast Avengers #1–4 (1984 mini-series)
What If #34, 43 (1982–1984)

Valiant Comics
Armed and Dangerous #1–4 (1996)
Armed and Dangerous Hell's Slaughterhouse #1–4 (1996–1997)
Shadowman #0, 10–12, 14-16 , 19, 22, 26–43 (1993–1995)

References

External links

Bob Hall at Comicvine
Bob Hall at Mike's Amazing World of Comics
Bob Hall at the Unofficial Handbook of Marvel Comics Creators

1944 births
20th-century American artists
20th-century American dramatists and playwrights
21st-century American artists
American comics artists
American comics writers
American theatre directors
Artists from Lincoln, Nebraska
Comic book editors
DC Comics people
Living people
Marvel Comics people
The New School alumni
University of Nebraska–Lincoln alumni
Writers from Lincoln, Nebraska